The silver-rumped spinetail or silver-rumped needletail  (Rhaphidura leucopygialis, sometimes spelled Raphidura leucopygialis) is a species of swift in the family Apodidae.
It is found in Brunei, Indonesia, Malaysia, Myanmar, Singapore, and Thailand.
Its natural habitat is subtropical or tropical moist lowland forests.

References

silver-rumped spinetail
Birds of Melanesia
silver-rumped spinetail
silver-rumped spinetail
Taxonomy articles created by Polbot